"Down" is an episode of American horror anthology web television series Into the Dark that aired as the fifth episode of the show's first season. It originally premiered in the United States on February 1, 2019, on Hulu. The episode was directed by Daniel Stamm from a script written by Kent Kubena and stars Natalie Martinez, Matt Lauria, Arnie Pantoja, Diane Sellers, and Christina Leone.

Plot
In a high-rise office building on the evening before Valentine's Day, Guy (Matt Lauria) and Jennifer (Natalie Martinez) have been separately working late. Apparently the last people to leave, they enter the same elevator on different floors and make small talk. On the way down, the elevator abruptly stops due to the thunderstorm outside. With no cell phone signal, they worry they'll be stuck in the elevator together until Tuesday morning, as Monday is President's Day.

At first, the two hit it off. Guy shares his water and a bottle of wine (a gift from a client) while Jennifer shares some Hershey's Kisses she grabbed before leaving her office. Killing time, they sketch pictures of each other. Jennifer uses her cell phone to record videos of them relating past sexual escapades. Growing more intimate, they kiss and then have sex in the elevator.

Afterwards, Jennifer insists to Guy that their encounter was merely casual. Frustrated by what he sees as rejection, Guy admits that his story is a lie. His name isn't Guy and he's not an office worker. Instead, he works as one of the building's security guards and has essentially been stalking her. Furthermore, he stopped the elevator with his key when she wasn't looking. He then produces the elevator key and restarts the elevator.

Jennifer is furious; angrily telling him he'll rot in jail and "Guy" stops the elevator again. They get into a physical altercation, wherein the key is accidentally broken; truly trapping them inside.

"Guy" eventually breaks through the elevator's ceiling tiles and Jennifer persuades him into letting her climb out, promising she won't call the police. Once on top of the cabin, however, she flips him off before climbing up a ladder. "Guy" then pulls himself out to follow and, after a chase, pulls Jennifer down just as she's prying open the elevator doors on a higher floor before falling back into the elevator cabin. Jennifer is the first to recover and ties "Guy" up. Threatening to maim him with a cigar cutter, she records his video confession on her cell phone. This time, "Guy" reveals the truth: his name is John Deakins and he used to be a successful white collar worker until he crashed his car, killing a female passenger. After serving six months in jail, he couldn't get a promising job and he plotted the elevator incident to get a taste of his former life.

Very early Monday morning, another security guard, Eddie (Arnie Pantoja), arrives to take his girlfriend up to the high-rise's roof. He notices the elevator's stuck and works to free the pair. John, who has untied his hands and knocked Jennifer unconscious, lures Eddie halfway into the elevator before starting it and slicing the man in half. After cleaning up, John deletes files from the security desk computer and kills Eddie's girlfriend. He then carries an unconscious Jennifer to the parking garage, stuffs her into his car trunk, and drives away.

When John stops the car and opens its trunk, Jennifer appears to be dead. However, she suddenly attacks, knocking him down. She gets into his car and begins to drive away, before reversing and crashing into a dumpster in which John has dived into. Jennifer starts to walk away, puffing on a cigar when turns and tosses the lit cigar into the dumpster, and it bursts into flames, killing John.

Production

Development
On November 27, 2018, it was reported that an episode centered on Valentine's Day and titled "Down" would air in February 2019. On December 18, 2018, it was reported that the episode was directed by Daniel Stamm from a script written by Kent Kubena and that premiered on February 1, 2019.

Casting
Simultaneously with the announcement of the director, it was confirmed that the episode would star Natalie Martinez, Matt Lauria, Arnie Pantoja, Diane Sellers, and Christina Leone.

Release
On December 23, 2018, a series of still images from the episode were released featuring Matt Lauria and Natalie Martinez. On January 14, 2019, another image from the episode was released. Three days later, another series of images were released. On January 22, 2019, the official trailer for the episode was released.

Reception

On Rotten Tomatoes, the episode has a score of 73% based on reviews from 15 critics, with an average rating of 6.61/10. The website's critics consensus reads: "With its clever concoction of suspense, violence, and romance, Down offers a titillating story that entertains on many levels."

At RogerEbert.com, Brian Tallerico granted the episode only one star out of four, calling it the worst episode in the series to date. Writing that the script was a mess, Tallerico said "Down" fell into the outdated “sexually active characters suffer” model of the genre. In a more favorable three-star review at The Daily Dot, Eddie Strait called the episode "a fleet, economical film" whose sense of humor about itself kept it from descending into cliché. A generally positive review at Bloody Disgusting called "Down" a bottle episode that is "ultimately predictable fun."

References

External links
 

Into the Dark (TV series) episodes
2018 American television episodes